Sergio Lobera Rodríguez (born 16 January 1977) is a Spanish professional football manager, currently in charge of China League One club Sichuan Jiuniu.

Football career
Lobera was born in Zaragoza, Aragon. After impressing with Dosa Salesians and UFB Jàbac Terrassa he signed with FC Barcelona in 1997, going through its youth system and being manager of the C team in 2006–07, in Tercera División. He was appointed sporting director at Terrassa FC in June 2007, also being their coach for the last seven games of the season.

In May 2010, Lobera was appointed CD San Roque de Lepe manager, agreeing to a three-year deal. The following campaign, he was in charge of AD Ceuta also in Segunda División B.

On 11 May 2012, Lobera was named FC Barcelona's assistant manager behind Tito Vilanova. However, roughly a month later, he signed as head coach of Segunda División side UD Las Palmas.

Lobera finished his first season in charge of a professional club in sixth position, being defeated in the play-offs by eventually promoted UD Almería. He renewed with the Canarians on 18 June 2013, but was relieved of his duties on 26 May of the following year.

On 24 December 2014, Lobera was appointed at Botola's Moghreb Tétouan until the end of the season. On 6 June 2017 he moved countries again, joining FC Goa from the Indian Super League on a two-year contract.

On 17 November 2018, Lobera renewed his link at the Fatorda Stadium until 2020. Five months later, he led his team to the conquest of the Indian Super Cup. On 31 January 2020, however, he was dismissed despite being top of the table after several run-ins with the board of directors.

Lobera continued in the Indian top flight in March 2020, signing with Mumbai City FC. He was officially presented on 12 October, being crowned champion in his debut campaign.

On 19 January 2022, Lobera was appointed at China League One club Sichuan Jiuniu FC.

Managerial statistics

Honours
Goa
Indian Super League Winners' Shield: 2019–20
Indian Super Cup: 2019

Mumbai City
Indian Super League: 2020–21
Indian Super League Winners' Shield: 2020–21

References

External links

1977 births
Living people
Sportspeople from Zaragoza
Spanish football managers
Segunda División managers
Segunda División B managers
Tercera División managers
Terrassa FC managers
AD Ceuta managers
UD Las Palmas managers
Botola managers
Moghreb Tétouan managers
Indian Super League head coaches
FC Goa managers
Mumbai City FC head coaches
China League One managers
Sichuan Jiuniu F.C. managers
Spanish expatriate football managers
Expatriate football managers in Morocco
Expatriate football managers in India
Expatriate football managers in China
Spanish expatriate sportspeople in Morocco
Spanish expatriate sportspeople in India
Spanish expatriate sportspeople in China
FC Barcelona non-playing staff